The 2016 Open de Guadeloupe was a professional tennis tournament played on hard courts. It was the sixth edition of the tournament which was part of the 2016 ATP Challenger Tour. It took place in Le Gosier, Guadeloupe between 4 and 10 April 2016.

Singles main-draw entrants

Seeds

 1 Rankings as of 21 March 2016.

Other entrants
The following players received wildcards into the singles main draw:
  Félix Auger-Aliassime
  Grégoire Jacq
  Gianni Mina
  Rajeev Ram

The following players received entry as alternates:
  Stefan Kozlov
  Gonzalo Lama

The following player received entry courtesy of a protected ranking:
  Peter Polansky

The following players received entry from the qualifying draw:
  Julien Dubail
  Emilio Gómez	
  Hubert Hurkacz
  Jorge Montero

Champions

Singles 

  Malek Jaziri def.  Stefan Kozlov, 6–2, 6–4

Doubles 

  James Cerretani /  Antal van der Duim def.  Austin Krajicek /  Mitchell Krueger, 6–2, 5–7, [10–8]

External links
Official Website

Open de Guadeloupe
Open de Guadeloupe
2016 in French tennis
2016 in Guadeloupean sport